Michael Thompson is a Canadian politician who has been a Toronto city councillor since 2003. He currently represents Ward 21 Scarborough Centre.

Early life and education 
Raised in Scarborough, Thompson is a Jamaican Canadian. He completed his public school education from Ionview Public School and Sir John A. Macdonald Collegiate, and completed a Bachelor of Arts at Concordia University in Montreal. Prior to being elected as a city councillor, he worked in the financial services industry, and founded a business services company.

Political career
He entered local politics in 1994 but was defeated in his attempt to win election to Metro Toronto council by Norm Kelly. In 1998 he became assistant to Councillor Lorenzo Berardinetti. When Berardinetti was elected to the Legislative Assembly of Ontario, Thompson successfully ran to replace him in the 2003 Toronto municipal election.

With a focus on "law and order" issues, Thompson is considered one of the more right-wing members of Toronto council. Soon after his election, he earned considerable and generally positive media attention for his forceful calls to address urban violence. He campaigned for a time to retain Julian Fantino as chief of the Toronto Police Service, and also pushed for a hotline to report troublesome rodents.

In the summer of 2005, dubbed "The Summer of the Gun", where Toronto saw a wave of shootings particularly in certain low-income neighbourhoods, Thompson garnered national attention for a suggestion that Toronto police should potentially be allowed or expected to stop and search young Black Canadian males at random. Thompson argued that a large percentage of the guns being used and a large number of victims are in the black community. Thompson was accused of racial profiling and also expressed surprise that a black politician would suggest such an idea. Thompson himself said that he did not actually suggest racial profiling and later clarified his proposal, stating that he would not call for police to pull people over just because they're black, but rather because gun violence was affecting the black community. Thompson said that phone calls and e-mails received by his office had been mostly positive.

Despite this, Thompson quickly withdrew the suggestion, saying it was "not an idea we can or should try", and characterizing his comment as an "off-the-cuff" remark born of frustration with recent violence. Some critics suggested it could have been a calculated attempt to position himself for political advantage, perhaps for a conservative candidacy for mayor. Thompson denied he was thinking of a mayoral run.

Thompson and other Scarborough-area city councillors are currently campaigning to replace the Scarborough RT with a tunnelled extension of the Bloor-Danforth subway, arguing they could gain more ridership than the proposed Spadina line extension to York University.

Thompson had an expense claim of $300 to have his office blessed by a local Baptist Pastor in December 2010.

In November 2013, during the Rob Ford scandal over his behavior and drug use, city Councillors met to question Ford. Thompson questioned Ford about an alleged crack house. Ford replied "Have you visited the house? Have you walked in the house?" Thompson replied "I have no interest in being in that house. I am not a crack user."

Thompson was re-elected in the 2014 municipal election with over 80% of the vote.

In May 2017, Thompson helped Air Canada crew and other passengers restrain an unruly passenger who allegedly tried to open a cabin door on a flight from Jamaica to Toronto, which had to subsequently be diverted to Orlando, Florida.

Thompson ran for Councillor for Toronto City Council in the 2018 municipal election  in the newly expanded Ward 21 Scarborough Center, created as a result of the Toronto ward boundary changes imposed by the Ontario government of Doug Ford in the middle of the campaign, winning with a large plurality. He largely supported the proposed cut in the number of city councillors from 50 to 25. 

In 2019, Toronto Mayor John Tory named Thompson the city's first Ambassador for the Night Economy, a role created to help spotlight and support businesses that flourish when the daytime economy sleeps.

During the 2022 municipal election, Thompson was charged with two counts of sexual assault by the Muskoka district Ontario Provincial Police (OPP) detachment. In a statement following the news, Mayor Tory announced that Thompson had agreed to step down as chair of the city's economic development committee and as deputy mayor.

Election results

References

External links

Living people
Businesspeople from Toronto
Toronto city councillors
Concordia University alumni
People from Scarborough, Toronto
Black Canadian politicians
Year of birth missing (living people)
Black Canadian businesspeople
Canadian people of Jamaican descent